Georgi Todorov (born 13 June 1956) is a Bulgarian professional football manager.

Honours
Player 
Levski Sofia

 Bulgarian A PFG – 1979
 Bulgarian Cup – 1979

Coach
Levski Sofia

 Bulgarian Cup – 2003

References

External links
Georgi Todorov Profile at levskisofia.info

Bulgarian footballers
First Professional Football League (Bulgaria) players
PFC Levski Sofia players
FC Etar Veliko Tarnovo players
FC Dunav Ruse players
PFC Litex Lovech players
FC Lokomotiv Gorna Oryahovitsa players
Bulgarian football managers
PFC Levski Sofia managers
Footballers from Sofia
Association football forwards
1956 births
Living people